Lesley Elizabeth Mahmood is a British politician. She was active in Militant and Liverpool politics along with her brother Roy Farrar in the 1970s and 1980s.

Mahmood was prominent in the Liverpool District Labour Party's campaign for more money for the city from the government of Margaret Thatcher, and was elected to the city council as part of the Liverpool 29 who replaced the Liverpool 47 when they were surcharged in 1986.

She was also prominent in the campaign against the Poll Tax and was put forward to be the Labour candidate in the Liverpool Walton by-election caused by the death of Eric Heffer in  1991. Although she won a majority of 92 out of 140 Walton Labour Party members, once the union votes were counted, Peter Kilfoyle became the Labour Party candidate.  In the ensuing by-election, Kilfoyle won with 21,317 (53.1%) votes while Mahmood, standing as Walton Real Labour, came third with 2,613 and 6.5% of the vote. The Walton by-election was a factor in the decision by Militant to leave the Labour Party, setting up first Militant Labour and then the Socialist Party.

Mahmood was later active in support of the sacked Liverpool Dockers.  She left the Socialist Party in 1998 in disputes over the Euro, trade unions, and the relevance of democratic centralism to modern socialist politics and became a supporter of the Socialist Solidarity Network.

References

British Trotskyists
Councillors in Liverpool
Militant tendency supporters
Living people
Year of birth missing (living people)
Politicians from Liverpool
Socialist Party (England and Wales) members
Women councillors in England